Solitary confinement is a punishment or special form of imprisonment in which a prisoner is denied contact with any other persons.

Solitary Confinement may also refer to:
Albums
 Solitary Confinement (Leæther Strip album), 1992
 Solitary Confinement (Rhyme Asylum album), 2010

Songs
 "Solitary Confinement", a punk single released by The Members in 1979